The Japan–Korea Treaty of 1882, also known as the Treaty of Chemulpo or the Chemulpo Convention,   was negotiated between Japan and Korea following the Imo Incident in July 1882.

Background
On July 23, 1882, factional strife between Koreans in Korea's capital expanded beyond the initial causes of the disturbance.

As the violence unfolded, the Japanese legation was destroyed by rioters.  The Japanese diplomats were forced to flee the country.  When order was restored, the Japanese government demanded damages and other concessions form the Korean government.

The negotiations were concluded in August 1882.

Article V of the "convention" permitted the Japanese to protect the Japanese legation and the Japanese community in Korea.

In 1884, the Japanese forgave the ¥400,000 indemnity which had been mandated by the treaty.

See also
 Unequal treaties

Notes

References
 Duus, Peter. (1995). The Abacus and the Sword: The Japanese Penetration of Korea, 1895–1910. Berkeley: University of California Press.  
 Takenobu, Yoshitaro. (1887). The Japan Yearbook; Complete Cyclopaedia of General Information and Statistics on Japan and Japanese Territories. Tokyo: Japan Year Book Office. 

Japan–Korea relations
History of the foreign relations of Japan
Japanese imperialism and colonialism
Unequal treaties
Treaties of the Empire of Japan
Treaties of the Joseon dynasty
1882 treaties
1882 in Korea
1882 in Japan
Bilateral treaties of Japan